Country Gospel is a studio album by American recording artist Wanda Jackson. It was released in January 1973 via Word Records and contained 11 tracks. The album was Jackson's twentieth released in her career and her second collection of gospel music. It was also her first album issued on the Word record label, after nearly twenty years recording for Capitol Records.

Background and content
Wanda Jackson had recently left Capitol Records after recording a mixture of Rockabilly and country selections, such as "Let's Have a Party" (1960), "Right or Wrong" and "The Box It Came In" (1966). In 1971, she discovered Christianity, which led to the decision to record more gospel material. According to Jackson, she was given an early release from Capitol's roster in 1973 to pursue a gospel contract with Word Records. The reasoning behind signing Jackson was so Word could "take the company to all markets in a full-scale operation," according to Billboard. 

Jackson went into the studio with producer Billy Ray Hearn in November 1972 to record a collection of gospel tracks for her first Word release. The session was cut at the Jack Clement Studio, located in Nashville, Tennessee. The album consisted of 11 songs. The final track was a self-penned tune written by Jackson. It also included covers of "Why Me, Lord" and "I Saw the Light".

Release and reception

Country Gospel was released in January 1973 on Word Records, becoming Jackson's twentieth studio album released in her career. It also marked her first release for the Word company. The album was originally distributed as a vinyl LP, containing six songs on "side A" and five songs on "side B". Although a full review was not provided, AllMusic rated the album, giving it only two stars. The album failed to reach any notable charting positions, including the Billboard Top Country Albums survey, which Jackson's albums often made appearances on. She would record several more gospel and country albums for the Word and Myrrh record labels during the 1970s. However, these albums lacked any commercial success.

Track listing

Personnel
All credits are adapted from the liner notes of Country Gospel.

Musical personnel
 Joe Babcock – Background vocals
 Kenneth Buttrey – Drums
 Jerry Carrigan – Drums
 Ray Edenton – Guitar
 Dolores Edgin – Background vocals
 Hurshel Wiginton – Background vocals
 Wanda Jackson – Lead vocals
 Weldon Myrick – Steel guitar
 June Page – Background vocals
 Billy Sanford – Guitar
 Jerry Shook – Guitar
 Jerry Smith – Piano
 Jack Williams – Bass

Technical personnel
 Dick Cobb – Photography
 Billy Ray Hearn – Producer
 Farrell Morris – Percussion
 Charlie Tallent – Engineer
 Bill Williams – Liner notes

Release history

References

1973 albums
Wanda Jackson albums
Word Records albums